The Santiago Light Rail is a planned light rail system within the City of Santiago de los Caballeros, Dominican Republic, and the Cibao International Airport. This will be the second urban rail transit system in the Dominican Republic (Santo Domingo Metro being the first).

Approval and construction 
The construction of the light rail line crossing Santiago was approved by the Santiago municipal government.  It is intended to help the city's traffic problems. To be constructed by the Spanish railway company FEVE, the line will be relatively short and will take 14 months to construct according to city officials. The Dominican central government will not provide construction funds. It will end at the Cibao Airport, its total length will be . Construction was originally scheduled to begin in mid-2008. As of today the project is on hold due to insufficient studies about the benefits of this system. It is reported that as soon as studies are complete, work will commence.

The train stations have not been officially announced, though it is reported that there will be twelve, including the Héroes de la Restauración monument in the city centre, Avenida de la Independencia, Avenida de la Circunvalacion, and a terminus at the Airport.

See also
 Santo Domingo Metro
 Rail transport in the Dominican Republic

References

External links
FEVE website (Spanish)

Tram transport in the Dominican Republic
Santiago de los Caballeros
Proposed public transport in North America